= Small Town (radio play) =

- Genre: drama play
- Running time: 60 mins (8:00 pm – 9:00 pm)
- Country of origin: Australia
- Language: English
- Written by: Kathleen Carroll
- Original release: June 16, 1946

Small Town is a 1946 Australian radio play by Kathleen Carroll. It won a £50 prize as one of the two runners-up in the Lux Radio Theatre Play Competition. She was inspired to write it after visiting an old mining town.

The play was one of the most regarded Australian radio plays of the 1940s.

The Sydney Tribune said "It is to be hoped that this play will be heard again soon."

The play was produced again in 1952 by the ABC. One listener of this production felt the script was "brutally massacred from beginning to end. With the exception of a few minor characters... the performances were obviously amateurish and distinctly bad, lacking in all conviction. The production was also amateurish and distinctly bad."

== Premise ==
A doctor's wife, Gay, longs to escape the small mining town of Brampton. Her husband helps out during a mining disaster.
